{{DISPLAYTITLE:C5H9N3}}
The molecular formula C5H9N3 (molar mass: 111.15 g/mol, exact mass: 111.0796 u) may refer to:

 Betazole (also called ametazole)
 Histamine